Bay of Sails is a shallow indentation in the coast of Victoria Land between Spike Cape and Gneiss Point. The bay is the end point of Scheuren Stream, which carries meltwater from Wilson Piedmont Glacier.

The name was first suggested by the Western Geological Party of the British Antarctic Expedition, 1910–13, which erected makeshift sails on their man-drawn sledge while sledging across the ice at the mouth of the bay, thereby increasing their speed.

References
 

Bays of Victoria Land
Scott Coast